John Blackham may refer to:
 Jack Blackham (1854–1932), Australian cricketer
John Blackham, 2nd Baronet (died 1728), of the Blackham baronets

See also
Blackham (disambiguation)